is a major table tennis apparel and equipment supplier using the brand name Butterfly, based in Japan with offices in Moers, Germany (Tamasu Butterfly Europe), Shanghai (Tamasu Butterfly China) and Seoul (Tamasu Butterfly Korea).  The company was founded in 1950 in Yanai city, Japan, by Hikosuke Tamasu, a Japanese table tennis player at the time.

Butterfly sponsors top players and coaches in different countries such as USA, Korea, Canada, Germany, Japan, Poland, and many more. Butterfly is not only a corporation that supplies table tennis players with equipment and clothes, but also sponsors tournaments, open camps for training, and have clubs located in the Americas. The Butterfly blades use carbon materials such as Tamasu Carbon (TamCa) 5000, or Uniaxial Light Carbon (ULC), fiber materials such as Arylate (AL) or Zylon (ZL), or composite materials such as Arylate + TamCa5000 (ALC) or Zylon + ULC (ZLC) or high molarity (Super) ZLC (SZLC).

References

External links
  

Manufacturing companies based in Tokyo
Manufacturing companies established in 1950
1950 establishments in Japan
Sporting goods manufacturers of Japan
Sportswear brands
Japanese brands